The 2016 Motorcycle Grand Prix of the Americas was the third round of the 2016 MotoGP season. It was held at the Circuit of the Americas in Austin on April 10, 2016.

Classification

MotoGP

Moto2

Moto3

Championship standings after the race (MotoGP)
Below are the standings for the top five riders and constructors after round three has concluded.

Riders' Championship standings

Constructors' Championship standings

 Note: Only the top five positions are included for both sets of standings.

References

Grand Prix of the Americas
Grand Prix of the Americas
Motorcycle Grand Prix of the Americas
Motorcycle
Motorcycle